Letheringsett with Glandford is a civil parish in the English county of Norfolk. It includes the village of Letheringsett, along with the hamlet of Glandford. The village straddles the A148 King’s Lynn to Cromer road. Letheringsett is 1.2 miles west of Holt, 32.2 west north east of King’s Lynn and 126 miles north north east of London. The nearest railway station is at Sheringham for the Bittern Line which runs between Sheringham, Cromer and Norwich. The nearest airport is Norwich International Airport.

Toponymy 
The origin of the name 'Letheringsett' is uncertain. Perhaps, 'dwelling-place of Leodhere's people' or 'dwelling-place of the Hleothringas (= the dwellers on the noisy stream)'. Alternatively, 'dwellers on the Hleothre'.

'Glandford' means 'Revelry ford', suggesting that games or sports were held here.

Description
The village of Letheringsett is situated in the valley of the River Glaven and has two watermills, Letheringsett Brewery watermill which stands on the west side of the river next to the A148 road bridge and is now disused, and Letheringsett Watermill which lies 150 yards to the south. It is the last working watermill in the county of Norfolk, has won several prestigious awards for its flour production and is a tourist attraction. Next to the Brewery watermill is the village pub, the King’s Head, which was built in the Georgian period.

Letheringsett Hall is a care home. It is a Grade II* listed building.

St Andrew's Church
The Church of England parish church of Letheringsett, St Andrew's, is one of 124 existing round-tower churches in Norfolk.

The church appeared on a Great Britain commemorative stamp, issued on 21 June 1972 as part of a set on British Architecture (Village Churches).

Notable people
Jane Lead (1624–1704), a Christian mystic, was born at Letheringsett 
John Burrell (1762–1825), entomologist and Rector of Letheringsett from 1786 to 1825
Herbert Hardy Cozens-Hardy, 1st Baron Cozens-Hardy (1838-1920), Liberal politician and judge
Mary Hardy (1733–1809), diarist

References

http://kepn.nottingham.ac.uk/map/place/Norfolk/Letheringsett
http://kepn.nottingham.ac.uk/map/place/Norfolk/Glandford%20with%20Bayfield

External links

 St Andrew's on the European Round Tower Churches website
 History of Letheringsett watermill

Civil parishes in Norfolk
North Norfolk